Dunaiv is a village in  Lviv Raion, Lviv Oblast in western Ukraine. Local government is administered by Dunaivska village council. It belongs to Peremyshliany urban hromada, one of the hromadas of Ukraine. Area of the village totals is 2.84 km2 and the population of village is 683 persons.

Geography 
The village is located in the Peremyshlianskyi district (Peremyshliany Raion) on the border of the Ternopil Oblast.

History 
The first known written reference – July 15, 1386. Governor of Galicia–Volhynia Vladyslav Opolchyk gave the village an everlasting possession.

In 1413 was founded the Catholic church parish in Dunaiv. The diocese was canonically erected on August 28, 1412 by Pope Gregory XII.

Until 18 July 2020, Dunaiv belonged to Peremyshliany Raion. The raion was abolished in July 2020 as part of the administrative reform of Ukraine, which reduced the number of raions of Lviv Oblast to seven. The area of Peremyshliany Raion was merged into Lviv Raion.

Monuments of architecture 
Architectural monuments of the Peremyshliany Raion are located in the village  Dunaiv:
 Saint Stanislaus church in Dunaiv (stone) 1485, 1585 (433)
 Church of the Nativity Blessed Virgin Mary (20th century), Dunaiv	(2336-М) 
 Palace of the 20th century (488-М)

References

External links 
 village Dunaiv{{Dead link|date=July 2019 |bot=InternetArchiveBot |fix-attempted=yes }
 Замки і храми України\Дунаїв

Literature 
  Page 370

Villages in Lviv Raion